"Moving On Up (On the Right Side)" is the fourth single released by British R&B singer-songwriter Beverley Knight, taken from her debut album The B-Funk (1995). It was written by W. Jones and S. Jones and produced by The Ethnic Boyz. The song contains a sample of "You're Too Good To Me" by the soul musician Curtis Mayfield, which was also sampled by American singer-songwriter Mary J. Blige on her single "Be Happy" for her second album My Life (1994). Both songs were recorded in 1994.

"Moving On Up (On the Right Side)" peaked at #42 on the UK Singles Chart when it was released in March 1996 as a single. The song did not have a promotional video made to accompany the release but it received support from urban radio which helped the release chart inside the top 75. The single is one of the few original recordings (excluding cover versions) released by Knight to date that she did not write herself.

Knight most recently performed "Moving On Up (On the Right Side)" on her Soul UK tour as part of a medley.

Track list

CD single
"Moving On Up (On the Right Side)" (Radio Version) - 4:13
"Moving On Up (On the Right Side)" (Ethnic Boyz Remix) - 5:09
"Moving On Up (On the Right Side)" (D-Lux Remix) 5:14
"Moving On Up (On the Right Side)" (Full Crew/Wayne Lawnes Remix) - 5:06
"Moving On Up (On the Right Side)" (Ee Be's Rap Remix) - 5:34
"Moving On Up (On the Right Side)" (Album Version) - 5:08

12" vinyl
"Moving On Up (On the Right Side)" (Album Version) - 5:08
"Moving On Up (On the Right Side)" (Ethnic Boyz Remix) - 5:09
"Moving On Up (On the Right Side)" (D-Lux Remix) 5:14
"Moving On Up (On the Right Side)" (Ee Be's Rap Remix) - 5:34

Personnel
Written by Westley
Produced by The Ethnic Boyz
All vocals performed by Beverley Knight

Charts

Release history

References

See also
Beverley Knight discography

1996 singles
Beverley Knight songs
Hip hop soul songs
1995 songs